is  the Supervising coach of the Cyberdyne Ibaraki Robots in the Japanese B.League.

Head coaching record

 
|-
| style="text-align:left;"|Otsuka Corporation Alphas
| style="text-align:left;"|2012-13
|32||13||19|||| style="text-align:center;"|4th in Eastern|||-||-||-||
| style="text-align:center;"|-

|-
| style="text-align:left;"|Cyberdyne Ibaraki Robots
| style="text-align:left;"|2017-18
|60||38||22|||| style="text-align:center;"| 2nd in B2 Central|||-||-||-||
| style="text-align:center;"|-
|-
|-

References

1973 births
Living people
Cyberdyne Ibaraki Robots coaches
Cyberdyne Ibaraki Robots players

Japanese basketball coaches
Nagoya Diamond Dolphins players
Nihon University Red Sharks men's basketball players
Otsuka Corporation Alphas coaches
Otsuka Corporation Alphas players